Pyrausta fodinalis is a moth in the family Crambidae. It was described by Julius Lederer in 1863. It is found in North America, where it has been recorded from British Columbia to Quebec and the north-eastern United States. It is also present in California, Nevada, Colorado and Wyoming. The habitat consists of undisturbed prairie and grassland areas.

The wingspan is 22–25 mm. The forewings are pinkish buff. The hindwings are whitish buff with a fuscous postmedial line. Adults are on wing from June to August.

The larvae feed on Monardella villosa.

Subspecies
Pyrausta fodinalis fodinalis (California)
Pyrausta fodinalis monticola Munroe, 1976 (California, Nevada, Colorado, Wyoming)
Pyrausta fodinalis septenrionicola Munroe, 1976 (British Columbia, Alberta, Manitoba, Ontario, Quebec)

References

Moths described in 1863
fodinalis
Moths of North America